Coal Hollow is an unincorporated community and coal town in Elk County, Pennsylvania, United States. It was also known as Toby Mines.

References

Coal towns in Pennsylvania
Unincorporated communities in Elk County, Pennsylvania
Unincorporated communities in Pennsylvania